This is a list of venues used for professional baseball in Atlanta, Georgia. The information is a compilation of the information contained in the references listed.

Peters Park
Home of: Atlanta - Southern League (1885-mid-1886) (1888-1889 part season)
Location: West Peachtree Street Northwest; North Avenue Northeast

Brisbane Park
Home of: Atlanta Crackers - Southern League (1892-1893,1896-1898) - some sources say Southeastern League for (1896-1897)
Location: Crumley Street Southwest (north); Glenn Street Southwest (south); Ira Street Southwest
Currently: part of or adjacent to Phoenix Park public park

Athletic Grounds
Home of: Atlanta Crackers - Southern League (1894-1895)
Location: Jackson Street Northeast; Irwin Street (similar to 1896 ballpark)

Show Grounds
Home of: Atlanta Crackers - Southern League (1896 some games)
Location: Jackson Street Northeast (west); Irwin Street Northeast; Boulevard Northeast (east)
Currently: On or near Martin Luther King Jr. Historic Site

Piedmont Park
Home of: Atlanta Crackers - Southern Association (1902-1906)
Location: Piedmont Avenue Northeast (west/north); 10th Street Northeast (south); Monroe Drive Northeast (east)
Previously: site of Piedmont Exposition
Currently: the larger public park is Atlanta's central park; softball and soccer fields exist

Ponce de Leon Park a.k.a. Spiller Park / Spiller Field (1924–1932)
Home of:
Atlanta Crackers - Southern Association (1907-1961)
Atlanta Black Crackers - Negro leagues (1920s)
Atlanta Black Crackers - Negro American League (1938)
Atlanta Crackers - International League (1962-64)
Location: 650 Ponce de Leon Avenue Northeast (south, first base); Lakeview Avenue Northeast (west, third base); Southern Railroad (east/northeast, right/center field)
Currently: Midtown Place shopping center

Atlanta–Fulton County Stadium a.k.a. Fulton County Stadium a.k.a. Atlanta Stadium
Home of:
Atlanta Crackers - IL (1965 only)
Atlanta Braves - NL (1966 - 1996)
Location: 521 Capitol Avenue Southeast (right/center field); Fulton Street Southwest (north, left field); Clarke Street Southwest / Pollard Boulevard Southwest (west, third base / home plate); Georgia Avenue Southwest (south, first base)
Currently: parking lot for Turner Field / Center Parc Stadium
Future: to be site of Georgia State University baseball park

Turner Field reconfigured from Centennial Olympic Stadium
Home of: Atlanta Braves - NL (1997-2016)
Location: 755 Hank Aaron Drive Southeast (a.k.a. Capitol Avenue Southeast - right field); Georgia Avenue Southwest (north, left field); Pollard Boulevard Southwest / Washington Street Southwest (west, third base); Bill Lucas Drive Southwest (south, first base); across Georgia Avenue to the south from Atlanta Stadium
Previously: parking lot for Atlanta Stadium
Currently: reconfigured as a football venue now known as Center Parc Stadium

Truist Park
Home of: Atlanta Braves - NL (2017-present)
Location: Cumberland, Georgia, a suburb northwest of Atlanta. Ballpark is west of the interchange of I-75 and I-285. Local streets are Circle 75 Parkway (southeast and northeast, outfield and third base); Windy Ridge Parkway (northwest and southwest, home plate and first base); and Heritage Court (southwest - right field). Changed names on January 14, 2020. Formerly titled SunTrust Park prior to the merger title sponsor SunTrust and BB&T.

See also
Lists of baseball parks

References
Peter Filichia, Professional Baseball Franchises, Facts on File, 1993.

A
Atlanta
Sports venues in Atlanta
Baseball